Pitogo, officially the Municipality of Pitogo,  is a 4th class municipality in the province of Quezon, Philippines. According to the 2020 census, it has a population of 22,798 people.

History

The fact that Pitogo is built on a promontory of rolling hills has a great rationale behind. Historical records show that this site was selected by the town's founders in 1766 because its lofty elevation provided them with good look out points for the marauding vintas of Muslim pirates who were then threatening the safety of the natives.

In 1754, a band of Christian settlers led by Juan Mauricio founded the town farther inland, a few miles up the Mayubok River, (now Pinagbayanan), to be safe from Moro depredations. But despite this precaution, the Moros came and raided the town. They came along the coastal town of Kalilayan (Tayabas).

Two years later, in 1756, Alejo Bautista became the next ruler. Again, the Moros remembering the place, visited Mayubok, burned the settlement and killed many of its inhabitants. Due to so much fright, the people placed the biggest church bell in a banca but the banca capsized at Aasnan. Expert divers tried to recover the historic bell but their toil remained futile and all in vain.

The survivors built another settlement in 1760 along the banks of Cawayanin River under Bernabe Rafael. Likewise, this community was destroyed by the Moros. St. Paul (the patron saint) was lost. He was found in a nearby barrio. The people stayed for a short time in the said barrio naming it “Adia” meaning safety.

In 1766, Buenaventura Salvador selected a well-located hill, the Maaliw Hill where few fishing huts could be found. The place was chosen because from its summit, where a native watchtower (Castillo) could be found, the approaching Moro Vintas could easily be detected while still afar.

The founding of Pitogo became very sure when a strong ruler in the person of Geronimo Santiago took care of the poblacion. He was known as Maniago whom the pirates feared so much. He ruled for almost ten years from 1771 to 1780. During that time the patron saint became famous too. The belief was that St. Paul was protecting miraculously the new town. On one occasion, when the Moros were about to enter the town, the place became all darkness and so the Moros had not other recourse but to go away.

1781 came and Juan Encarnacion became the ruler. According to legend, this was the time when St. Paul the Apostle was found under a big Pitogo tree on the promontory of Maaliw Hill. Taking this as a good omen and believing that St. Paul liked the place to be the permanent location of the poblacion, the people named the place after this palm tree known as “Pitogo” and began to settle here. This name later applied to this whole town as the community grew.

Another Mauricio became the ruler in 1814. The town was burned for the first time due to the carelessness of the inhabitants.

A very good ruler in the person of Geronimo de los Angeles came in 1817. During his time the stone church was built on the same place where St. Paul was once found on Maaliw Hill.

For two centuries, Pitogo had survived Muslim raids, epidemic conflagrations and two major wars to emerge as a thriving, pulsating community that has seen some progress during the past decades.

Geography

Barangays
Pitogo is politically subdivided into 39 barangays.

Climate

Demographics

Economy

Tourism
 Conversion of Saint Paul Parish Church
 Countryside Hotel
 Soliyao Beach Resort
  Buhangin Beach
 Parola / Kastilyo
 Villa Rosa Ancestral House
 Taklob Beach
 Pacatin (Tapat-Ibayo)Beach
 Pitogo Wharf
Calli Tea (Cabulihan)

Education
Secondary schools
 Western Tayabas High School
 Amontay National High School
 Cabulihan National High School 
 Pitogo Community High School
 Sampaloc National High School

Elementary schools

Amontay Elementary School
Cabulihan Elementary School
Cawayanin Elementary School
Dulong Bayan Elementary School
Gangahin Elementary School
Pacatin Elementary School
Piña Elementary School
Pitogo Central School Bldg. 1
Pitogo Central School Bldg. 2
Poctol Elementary School
Quinagasan Elementary School
Rizalino Elementary School
Sampaloc Elementary School
Soliyao Elementary School
Sumag Elementary School

References

External links

Pitogo Profile at PhilAtlas.com
[ Philippine Standard Geographic Code]
Philippine Census Information
Local Governance Performance Management System

Municipalities of Quezon